Jimi Jules is a Swiss musician and DJ. His biggest success was a 2014 collaboration with the musician Oliver Dollar on the single "Pushing On"  which peaked at number 15 on the UK Singles Chart. He has also remixed a number of tracks for other artists as well as releasing his own material.

Discography 
2012 - Awakenings (EP)
2013 - Earl (EP)
2014 - "Come Along" / "Wide" (with Animal Trainer)
2014 - "Pushing On" (with Oliver Dollar)
2014 - "Hello Asshole"
2015 - No Wishes (EP)
2016 - Bogotá (EP)
2016 - Lost Love (EP)
2016 - Equinox
2018 - Midnight Juggernaut (EP)
2019 - Karma Baby (EP)
2019 - Fool (EP)
2021 - Ham the Monkey (EP)
2021 - My City's On Fire (EP)
2022 - Burning (Single)
2022 - +

References

Living people
Year of birth missing (living people)